Daniel Olivares may refer to:
Daniel Olivares (politician), a Peruvian politician
Daniel Olivares (cyclist), a Filipino cyclist